The 2009 Copa Chile was the 30th edition of the competition. The competition started on May 10, 2009 with the Preliminary Round and concluded on November 15, 2009 with the Final. The winner qualifies for the 2010 Copa Sudamericana.

Schedule

Teams
A record 82 clubs were accepted for the competition; one club, Luis Matte Larrain, folded before the fixtures were released, leaving 81 clubs to appear in the draw. The teams for this edition are the teams from the Primera Division, Primera B, Tercera Division, regional amateur club champions, and selected amateur teams.

Primera División 

Audax Italiano
Cobreloa
Cobresal
Colo-Colo
Curicó Unido
Deportes La Serena
Everton
Huachipato
Municipal Iquique

Ñublense
O'Higgins
Palestino
Rangers
Santiago Morning
Unión Española
Universidad Católica
Universidad de Chile
Universidad de Concepción

Primera B 

Coquimbo Unido
Deportes Antofagasta
Deportes Concepción
Deportes Copiapó
Deportes Melipilla
Deportes Puerto Montt
Lota Schwager

Naval
Provincial Osorno
San Marcos de Arica
Santiago Wanderers
San Luis
Unión La Calera
Unión San Felipe

Tercera División

Provincial AGC
Deportivo Lo Barnechea
Deportes Colchagua
Deportes Ovalle
Deportes Temuco
Deportes Valdivia
Fernández Vial
Iberia

Linares Unido
Magallanes
Municipal Mejillones
Corporación Peñalolén
San Antonio Unido
Trasandino
Unión Quilpué
Unión Temuco

Cuarta División 

Academia Quilpué
Academia Samuel Reyes
Corporación Ñuñoa
Deportes Cerro Navia
Deportes Quilicura
Deportes Santa Cruz
Enfoque de Rancagua
Ferroviarios
General Velásquez

Juventud Padre Hurtado
Juventud Puente Alto
Lautaro de Buin
Municipal La Pintana
Provincial Talagante
Pudahuel Barrancas
Real León
Universidad Iberoamericana

Regional teams 

Antofagasta - Asotel (Antofagasta)
Araucanía - Luchador (Lican Ray)
Arica & Parinacota - Trasandino de Socoroma (Arica)
Atacama - Juventus (Caldera)
Aysén - Lord Cochrane (Aysén)
Biobío - Lord Cochrane (Concepción)
Coquimbo - David Arellano (Coquimbo)
Los Lagos - Deportivo Lintz

Los Ríos - Audax de Futrono
Magallanes - Prat de Punta Arenas
Maule - Favorita (Lontué)
O'Higgins - Juan Lyon (Pichidegua)
Santiago Metropolitan - Manuel Rodríguez (Puente Alto)
Tarapacá - Yungay (Iquique)
Valparaíso - Balmaceda (San Antonio)

Special invitee 
Selección Rapa Nui

First round
This round comprised the 2009 Tercera B teams (except one), one Regional Amateur Champion, plus five of the winners of the Preliminary Round.

|}

Second round
This round comprised the winners of the First Round (except one), the remaining 2009 Tercera B team, and one Regional Amateur Champion team.

|}

Third round
This round comprised the winners of the Second Round (except two), the remaining winner of the First Round, the 2009 Tercera División teams, plus two Regional Amateur Champion teams.

|}

Fourth round
The Fourth Round marks the beginning of the competition for professional teams. The draw for the Fourth Round was held on July 31, 2009 and was conducted by the "Manager of National Tournaments", René Rosas. This round comprised the winners of the Third Round, the 2009 Primera B teams, Primera División team Colo-Colo, and special invitee Selección Rapa Nui (the Easter Island Team).

Fifth round

Final phase

Round of 16

Quarterfinals

Semifinals

Final

Top goalscorers

See also
 Primera División 2009
 Primera B
 Tercera División
 Tercera División B

External links
 Official site of the Copa Chile 
 Official regulations 
 Website of the Copa Chile 
 4th Round (Diario El Mercurio) 
 5th Round (Diario El Mercurio) 
 Round of 16 (Diario El Mercurio) 
 Quarterfinals (Diario El Mercurio) 
 Semifinals (Diario El Mercurio) 
 Final (Diario El Mercurio) 

Copa Chile
Chile
2009